Kensington is a locality in the Bundaberg Region, Queensland, Australia. Traditionally a rural area on the outskirts of Bundaberg, there is increasing residential development within the locality.

References

Suburbs of Bundaberg
Bundaberg Region
Localities in Queensland